Symphony of Life is the fourth live album released by Australian singer and songwriter Tina Arena on 23 November 2012. The album was filmed and recorded at the Arts Centre Melbourne's Hamer Hall during a series of sold-out concerts for her Australian fans. A DVD of this audio album was also released on the same date with the same cover artwork. Anthony Callea stepped in as special guest for the concert series.

Promotion
The live record and the DVD was heavily promoted on Arena's official website, Facebook and various online media outlets. Before the record was released, a TV special titled 'Tina Arena: Live in Melbourne' on Foxtel aired at 8:30 PM Saturday 17 November 2012. The same footage from the DVD was shown. Free Tina Arena postcards were given to those who pre-ordered the album prior to the release date.

Track listing

Charts
The live album debuted at #60 on the ARIA Main Australian Artist Chart. It has just spent a week on the top 100 and has been off the chart right after the next week. The album re-entered the charts at #95 a few weeks later. Meanwhile, the record debuted at #18 on the ARIA Top 20 Australian Albums Chart making it Arena's 10th Top 20 album on the said Australian-only Artist chart. The DVD debuted at #4 on the Top 40 ARIA Music DVDs Chart.

CD

DVD

References

Tina Arena albums
2012 live albums